The following is a list of squads for each nation competing in men's football at the 2013 Islamic Solidarity Games in Palembang, South Sumatra. Each nation could submit a squad of 23 players, all of whom must be born on or after 1 January 1990. A minimum of two goalkeepers (plus one optional dispensation goalkeeper) must be included in the squad.

Group A

Coach: Hadi Mutanash

Coach:

Coach: Anas Maklouf

Coach: Ersoy Sandalcı

Group B

Coach: Rahmad Darmawan

Coach: Hassan Benabicha

Coach: Firas Aburadwan

References

squads
2013